Ibrahim Sory Touré (15 September 1970 – 21 October 1996) was a Malian footballer. He played in three matches for the Mali national football team in 1994. He was also named in Mali's squad for the 1994 African Cup of Nations tournament.

References

1970 births
1996 deaths
Malian footballers
Mali international footballers
1994 African Cup of Nations players
Place of birth missing
Association football midfielders